is one of the twelve constriction techniques of Kodokan Judo in the Shime-waza list.

Included systems 
Systems:
Kodokan Judo, Judo Lists
Lists
The Canon Of Judo
Judo technique

Similar techniques, variants, and aliases 
Aliases:
Both hand choke 
Two-hand choke

Judo technique